Understood Betsy is a 1916 novel for children by Dorothy Canfield Fisher.

Plot summary
The story tells of Elizabeth Ann, a 9-year-old orphan girl who goes from a sheltered existence with her father's aunt Harriet and cousin Frances in the city, to living on a Vermont farm with her mother's family, the Putneys, whose child-rearing practices had always seemed suspect to Harriet and her daughter. In her new rural life, Elizabeth Ann comes to be nicknamed "Betsy," and to find that many activities that Frances had always thought too demanding for a little girl are considered, by the Putney family, routine activities for a child: walking to school alone, cooking, and having household duties to perform.

The child thrives in her new environment, learning to make butter, boil maple syrup, and tend the animals. She also loves to read to herself and to her family. When Frances announces she is to be married and has come to "save" Elizabeth Ann from the dreaded Putney cousins, she is amazed to discover that the little girl is quite content to stay. The story ends after Frances has returned home, with Betsy, her aunt Abigail, uncle Henry, and cousin Ann sitting quietly and happily around the fireplace enjoying the knowledge they will now be a family for good.

Footnotes

External links

Understood Betsy  – Project Gutenberg e-text
 

1916 American novels
American children's novels
Novels set in Vermont
Novels about orphans
1916 children's books